Filip Duranski (born 17 July 1991 in Skopje) is a Macedonian footballer who played for Olympiakos Nicosia in the Cypriot First Division.

External links
 Profile at Slavia Praha's official website 
 Profile at iDNES 
 Macedonian Football 

1991 births
Living people
Footballers from Skopje
Association football midfielders
Macedonian footballers
North Macedonia under-21 international footballers
SK Slavia Prague players
FK Mladá Boleslav players
FK Horizont Turnovo players
FK Rabotnički players
FK Sileks players
ŠKF Sereď players
Czech First League players
Macedonian First Football League players
Slovak Super Liga players
Macedonian expatriate footballers
Expatriate footballers in the Czech Republic
Macedonian expatriate sportspeople in the Czech Republic
Expatriate footballers in Slovakia
Macedonian expatriate sportspeople in Slovakia
Olympiakos Nicosia players